Stuart Adamson McKinstry (born 18 September 2002) is a Scottish professional footballer who plays as a winger for Motherwell, on loan from  club Leeds United.

Born in Wishaw, McKinstry is a product of Motherwell's academy. He moved to Leeds United in summer 2019, making his senior debut in 2021. In 2022 he returned to his boyhood club Motherwell on a one year loan.

Club career

Motherwell
Born in Wishaw, McKinstry supported Motherwell as a child, with both of his parents being Motherwell fans. He joined Motherwell's academy aged 10, and progressed to the first-team, appearing in the matchday squad as an unused substitute for a 1–0 defeat to Kilmarnock on 26 December 2018.

Leeds United
McKinstry joined Leeds United's academy in summer 2019, and signed a professional contract with the club in September 2019, with the contract valid until 2022. In August 2020, he signed a new contract with the club, valid until summer 2023. He made his first-team debut as a substitute in a 0–0 EFL Cup draw with Fulham on 21 September 2021, with McKinstry scoring the winning penalty as Leeds won the penalty shoot-out 6–5. McKinstry made his Premier League debut for Leeds on 21 November 2021 as a second half substitute in the 2–1 defeat to Tottenham Hotspur.

Motherwell loan
On 17 August 2022, Motherwell announced the return of McKinstry to the club, on a season-long loan deal from Leeds United. McKinstry scored goals in consecutive games against Rangers and Aberdeen respectively. McKinstry scored his third goal for the club coming off the bench against Hibs and also scored a 4th Motherwell goal against Ross County.

International career
McKinstry has represented Scotland internationally at under-17 level.

Style of play
McKinstry plays as a winger.

Career statistics

References

External links

2002 births
Living people
Scottish footballers
Sportspeople from Wishaw
Association football wingers
Motherwell F.C. players
Leeds United F.C. players
Scotland youth international footballers
Footballers from North Lanarkshire
Premier League players